Zevaco or Zévaco is a surname. Notable people with the surname include: 

Jean-François Zevaco (1916–2003), French-Moroccan architect
Jean-Pierre-Dominique Zévaco (1925–2017), French Catholic bishop
Michel Zevaco (1860-1918), French journalist, novelist, publisher, and film director